Dunapataj is a village in Bács-Kiskun county, Hungary. 

It is the administrative headquarters of the local museum. The Calvinist Church includes Gothic architecture remains from the 15th century and the Baroque-style Church of Saint John of Nepomuk dates from 1761. A former Transylvanian style Unitarian church, built in 1937, is located in the middle of town and houses the local history documents of the Museum of Pataj. 

Festivals are held in July and August - the Szelidi Summer - and September - the Pataji Autumn.

Politics

Partnerships 
 Since 2004 it there a partnership with the municipality Oyten in Germany

References

External links

  in Hungarian
 Dunapataj, CompAlmanach (a Hungarian tourism firm), accessed on 2008-07-26

Populated places in Bács-Kiskun County